Roman Jebavý and Antonio Šančić were the defending champions but only Jebavý chose to defend his title, partnering Florin Mergea. Jebavý lost in the first round to Denys Molchanov and Igor Zelenay.

Rameez Junaid and David Pel won the title after defeating Kevin Krawietz and Andreas Mies 6–2, 2–6, [10–7] in the final.

Seeds

Draw

External Links
 Main Draw
 Qualifying Draw

Heilbronner Neckarcup - Doubles
2018 Doubles